John Pope (1821–1880) was an artist in Boston, Massachusetts, and New York in the 19th century. He painted portraits of W.H. Prescott, Daniel Webster and others. He belonged to the Boston Artists' Association; and exhibited with the Massachusetts Charitable Mechanic Association (1844) and the New England Art Union (1852). Pope kept a studio in Boston's Tremont Temple; around 1857 he moved to New York. He died of illness in New York in 1880. According to one report: "Just before dying he called for his paint brush, and died holding it in his hand."

References

Further reading

 Death of John Pope, the artist. New York Times, Dec. 31, 1880. 
 David Bernard Dearinger. Paintings and Sculpture in the Collection of the National Academy of Design: 1826–1925. NY: Hudson Hills Press, 2004

1821 births
1880 deaths
Artists from Boston
American portrait painters
19th century in Boston
19th-century American painters
19th-century male artists